The 2014 season marked the 107th season in which the Richmond Football Club participated in the AFL/VFL.

2013 off-season list changes

Retirements and delistings

Free agency

Note: Compensation picks are awarded to a player's previous team by the league and not traded from the destination club

Trades

Note: All traded picks are indicative and do not reflect final selection position

National draft

Rookie draft

2014 squad

2014 season

Pre-season 

Source:AFL

Home and away season 

Source: AFL Tables

Finals 

Source: AFL Tables

Ladder

Awards

League awards

All-Australian team

22 Under 22 team

Brownlow Medal tally

Club awards

Jack Dyer Medal

Michael Roach Medal

Reserves
In 2014 Richmond broke away from their affiliated status with Coburg to field a stand-alone reserves side for the first time in over a decade. The team competed in the VFL and played home games at the club's Punt Road home. 
Richmond senior and rookie-listed players who were not selected to play in the AFL side were eligible to play for the team alongside a small squad of VFL-only listed players. 
The team finished 12th out of 16 participating clubs, with a record of 6 wins, one draw and 11 losses.

References

External links 
 Richmond Tigers Official AFL Site
 Official Site of the Australian Football League

Richmond Football Club seasons
Richmond Tigers